Personal Editor (PE) and Personal Editor II (PE2) was a text editor developed by IBM for IBM PC DOS and MS-DOS in the 1980s. It became popular because of its easy, fast, and programmable (custom keyboard shortcuts) user interface.
PE influenced its successor text editors, such as Personal Editor 32, a modern 32-bit editor with a user interface based on PE2/PE3, and QE, a text editor for Linux systems.

For Asia-Pacific region, IBM Japan released a DBCS version of Personal Editor for IBM 5550 and PS/55. It was available in IBM's lineup over the years, although the E editor came with PC DOS since version 6.1.

See also 
 E (PC DOS)

References

External links 
 PE2 on Text Editors Wiki
 Personal Editor 32 website

DOS text editors
IBM software
DOS software
Console applications